is a 2004 Japanese anime television series planned by Gainax and animated by J.C.Staff. The series originally aired between April 7, 2004, and September 21, 2004, on TBS.

Information

The Melody of Oblivion is a series rife with cultural references ranging from Zen archery and Bushido to the Bible's Book of Revelation, stories of Greek Mythology, and images from Borge's "The Garden of Forking Paths" can be seen in the series.

Melody of Oblivion's premise is that in the 20th century, humanity waged and lost a war against beings known only as the Monsters. In the 21st century, the Monsters rule the earth, but they have reconstructed society such that virtually no one born after the war ended is aware that it ever happened.  Children are disappearing mysteriously.  Only the Warriors of Melos are still fighting against the Monsters. The series focuses on Bocca, a teenager who chooses the path of the Warrior.  In doing so, he gains the power to fight back at the horrors he sees, but it costs him his place in society.

Melos Warriors are the only ones who can see the ephemeral "Melody", personified as a girl who appears at important times and shows emotion but does not speak.  The Melos, as they are also referred to, fight primarily with bows and arrows infused with the energies of their spirit (seemingly described in Italian words and phrases used in musical notation).  The visible marks (Sacred Scars) that they employ in this infusion process appear as tattoos on their person.

The Melos Warriors are aided by devices called Aibar machines (could also be transliterated as Aiba-Machine), which are essentially futuristic motorcycles with many additional capabilities.  ('Aiba' or 'Aibar' are transliterations for a word in Japanese meaning 'Favorite Horse.') The process of bonding a Warrior of Melos and an Aibar machine involves a symbolic naming of the bike by the one who is to ride it.  Thereafter, the Aibar machine follows voice commands.  All Aibar machines are at least minimally sentient, while some possess fully human-like intelligence.  As such, they can function mostly or completely independently of their drivers when need be.

Opposing the Melos Warriors are the Monsters themselves and their human lackeys, the Monster Union.  The former are always shown as normal looking human beings, however this is not what they truly look like. If a normal person (one who is not a Melos Warrior) looks at their true form, they will automatically transmogrify into a bizarre object (such as stone statues or puppets, but varying with whatever monster is being viewed.) It should also be noted that all the monsters mirror creatures of Greek Mythology, such as Horu, the first monster featured, who is referred to by Kurofune as a "disgusting cow" and is said to have been sealed in a labyrinth. This, along with the fact that a pair of bull horns and legs manifest when he is around, implies he is the legendary Minotaur. Several other featured monsters are Medusa, Hecate, Talos, and Pan. All monsters seem to have some control over reality itself and can only be killed by Melos Arrows.

The Monster Union, which is part Satanic cult and part ultra-fascist secret society, is composed of people who have been given power and authority in exchange for providing a steady supply of human sacrifices to their Monster overlords, and keeping the majority of humanity in the dark as to who holds the real power and what really goes on in the world.  The process of imbuing Monster Union members with their powers leaves a visible mark on the body identical to a hot iron brand mark.

Monster Union leaders employ machines called robot-monsters in combat, but in contrast to the Melos Warriors, there is no standard design among these machines aside from the fact that all seem to be shaped like animals from the Chinese zodiac. The names of these robots are also in Chinese.

The contrast between the Monster Union members and the Melos Warriors is suggestive of the text in Revelations where it refers to people being marked by Heaven and being marked by Hell.

Melody of Oblivion has a very distinctive soundtrack featuring prominent virtuoso violin by Hijiri Kuwano and acoustic guitar solos and other classical-style music. The music was composed and arranged by Yoshikazu Suo and Hijiri Kuwano. The theme music is titled "The Spirit of Flamenco". There are also more disturbing synth and amplified guitar pieces during scenes of creeping horror.  The show itself is also full of musical references, from the Melos Warriors' given names (Kurofune Ballad being the most obvious) to the Italian musical vocabulary which flashes on the Melos Warrior 'targeting interface' during battle (animato, con fuoco, passionato, energico, etc.).

Characters

Humans
 

 The main character. Brave, determined and equipped with a heart for adventure, Bocca is not your average school boy. In fact, he does badly in school and is disliked by his teachers. He eventually drops out to pursue his dreams of becoming a Melos Warrior, leaving behind the old and familiar, including his parents and brother. Bocca was a rebellious member of the archery club (the students are discouraged from using actual arrows since the monsters are trying to discourage the development of such skills) who longed to be a warrior to fight against the injustices he saw in the world.
Although people classify monsters as myth and tell Bocca to stay away from the old man who loiters near his school, he befriends the old man named Tsunagi, who is actually a scientist. Bocca also worked part-time for him at his auto-shop. Bocca soon meets Sayoko who tells him she is looking for a warrior; hearing this gives Bocca new hope for what he wants to do in life. When the warrior Kurofune (the same warrior Sayoko was looking for) goes to see Tsunagi, Bocca learns that Tsunagi was the leading scientist of aibanetic technology and an ally of the warriors. Later that day Bocca witnessed a battle between Hor and Kurofune, which awoke the possibility to become a warrior within him. When Kurofune leaves to continue on with his journey, Bocca and Sayoko decide to go after him. The series then follows Bocca's journey as he sees the damage the monsters have done, learns of the humans who have pledged allegiance to them, meets other Melos Warriors and develops a romantic relationship with Sayoko. His Melos tattoo is on his left arm, and his Aibar machine is Elan Vital. His command for his Melos arrow is "Flush." His bow was originally the bow he used for the archery club, and when it got broken, it was replaced by the handle bars of his Ivermachine.

 

 A girl who travels with Bocca to seek her love, Kurofune.  She was given as a sacrifice to the monsters by her parents to improve her brother's chances of becoming a Monster Union agent.  Kurofune rescued her and she fell in love with him.  She ran away from the home Kurofune placed her in to chase after him.  On her wrists she wears the chains that bound her as a sacrifice and with them she can track Kurofune. They will point to wherever Kurofune is if she is lucky and there's nothing standing in the way of her and Kurofune. During the journey, Sayoko develops a relationship with Bocca.

 Although her identity as a runaway child is the first facet of her character that is introduced to viewers, Sayoko is better known as daring, sensitive girl who is ready to risk all for love. She also has pick-pocketing skills to rival a professional, which helps her survive and bring her to Bocca. They later become friends when she realize that Bocca is a Melos Warrior, and decides to follow him so that she can look for Kurofune, whom she is initially in love with. Around Sayoko's left wrist is a red chain that vibrates and pulls her in the direction of Kurofune when he uses his power.
Bocca says that Sayoko is a “girl who belong to a world of sunlight”, but despite being generally cheerful in disposition, Sayoko's past is marred by a dark truth. Her parents always loved her brother more than her. When her brother grew up, Sayoko was sacrificed to help her brother become a member of the Monster Union and Kurofune saved her from it. That was when Sayoko fell for him. Together, Bocca and Sayoko traverses many monster-controlled area, delving into the monsters network and hierarchy. Amidst the conflicts and chaos, Bocca and Sayoko grow closer and find that their fondness for each other had developed into something more than friendship.

 

 The first Melos Warrior to appear, and Bocca's inspiration.  Instead of a bow, he wields a crossbow.  His aibar machine is Jaguar Sun. His Melos tattoo is on his left arm. His command for his Melos arrow is "Flush" (same as Bocca's.) He uses a bow gun.

 

 A quiet girl who is proficient with the bow. One will think that all Melos Warrior who find out about their powers would embrace their identities immediately, but not Toune’s. She first appeared as someone who can fight monsters, produce a Singing Chord, and seems to know a great deal about Melos Warrior. All she seemingly lacks are the tattoo and an Aibar Machine. In her conversation with Bocca, Toune disclose her hatred for Melos Warriors, and despise what she calls the arrogance of those who ride on Aibar Machines.
However, it soon becomes clear that her hatred for the Melos is a veneer to protect her from the truth that she is unwilling to accept: The boy she is in love with, Sky Blue, is really an Aibar Machine. After overcoming this, she finally slips into her role of a Melos warrior and mounts Sky Blue to travel to other places. Her tattoo is hidden on inner thigh of her right leg, explaining why Bocca thought she was not a Melos Warrior at first.  
Her Aibar is Sky Blue, an earlier model of the Unicorn-series. His first appearance in the series portrayed him to be a devil by Millionaire Beaver. Her command for her Melos arrow is "Straight flush." Her bow is a wooden bow that she carries around.

 

 A very young and playful girl, a feisty girl with risqué humor packaged in a petite frame. She may be young for a Melos Warrior, but she is just as masterful and confident as the other Melos Warrior. Her last name is the Italian word for lullaby.
A Monster Union Agent kidnapped her from her parents in the toy section of a department store.  She managed to escape before she could be sacrificed; however, to this day she cannot remember who her parents were or where she lived.  She is accompanied by three Unicorn-series aibar machines: Hikari, Nick, and Kuron. They came together when Koko awakened them. She had wanted to free all of the Unicorn-series Aibar Machines, but had no chance to so she set these three free and gave them names. Together they form the armed theatrical group Chentauro. Upon meeting Bocca and his friends, fighting monsters and uncovering mysteries together, she was reunited with her father, the Prime Minister. Misadventure has it that they only come together when he was at the brink of death. Father and Daughter never get to know each other beyond physical appearance. Her Melos tattoo is on her right cheek. Her command for her Melos arrow is "Four card." Her bow is formed from a stick that she carries, which expands to a bow at her command.

 

 An old man who owns a repair shop that Bocca worked at.  Kurofune comes to him to have his aibar machine, Jaguar Sun, repaired.  When the authorities arrive after Kurofune fights Hor, Saburou flees and joins the armed theater group, Chentaruo (this is not known until later in the series in episode 8–10). When Bocca meets Saburou again, it is revealed Saburou was a scientist who helped in the development of Aibar Machines and the Metronome, the space fortress that gives the Aibar Machines the ability to fly, and was supposed to destroy all monsters.

 

 A girl whose physical body is confined at an elusive area called the "Oblivion Playhouse" (also translated as "Melody Theatre"), but can project her image so Melos Warriors can see her. She guides and supports them, although her capacity for communication seems to be very limited. It is rumored among Melos Warriors that if her physical form can be located and resuscitated, she could unlock a power capable of wiping the Monsters off the face of the planet.

Monsters
 Horu / Minotaur

 Horu is the first monster Bocca meets in Melody of Oblivion, and is also the most recurring monster in the series. He is said to have been sealed in a labyrinth, but claims that he was able to leave his prison when he discovered that everything "is all part of the labyrinth" He holds a long-standing grudge against Kurofune. Like all monsters, he has a broad, albeit nebulous, range of abilities. He is seen in the anime to warp space and time around him, teleport, and is known to cause the stars to vanish for periods of time. Whenever he is in the area, a pair of bullhorns is seen somewhere close. He is accompanied by a small "toy" bus that he implements in his attack by transforming it to life-size, making it grow the horns and legs of a bull, and ramming it into his opponent. (In the past, he was seen to use a similar attack with a Jeep in lieu of a bus.) He is often chewing cud, which, along with other elements of his design such as the bullhorns and labyrinth, is supposed to imply that he is the Minotaur of Greek Mythology. (In fact, the walls of the labyrinth he was trapped in have murals on them depicting the birth of the Minotaur. Also, another way to translate his name is Hol, a reference to Holstein cattle.) Horu is unique among monsters in that he gains sustenance by reverting to his true form (which is never seen on camera) and physically devouring the children who are sacrificed to him. This is excruciatingly (and eternally) painful for his victims because he constantly regurgitates and masticates them, as a cow does with its food. Those that see him in his true form immediately and irreversibly transform into puppets.

 The Girl With Red Hair / Medusa

 The most childish and unpredictable of all the monsters featured. She appears as a young red-haired girl. Her transport of choice is a large cruise-liner called "The Hebihanabi," or "Snake Fireworks ship," that can move on land or sea, and is always accompanied by a thick fog. Her sacrifices are turned into stone statues through looking upon her true form, and are either kept in her onboard private collection, or used to decorate the cities under her command (she seems to have a preference for young and beautiful boys.) During one scene in the anime, bunch of snakes are scattered around after she throws her head at a mob of angry parents, implying that she is made out of snakes. One of her oddest features is that she is always accompanied by a servant whose voice is heard, but who never appears onscreen. Whether this servant is another monster or in fact an extension of her power is unknown. She was the monster that scouted out the Monster Union members Midnight Hiyoko and Millionaire Beaver, although she may have found others as well. Like all monsters, her powers are difficult to gauge, and she has an unquestionably evil nature. She is referred to as Medusa by other monsters, which goes along with the fact that she is associated with snakes, can petrify others at will and lastly, when she removed her head it was likely referencing the legend of when Perseus decapitated Medusa in combat, and later used her head (or rather her petrifying eyes) as a weapon. On top of that, The Monster king directly referred to her by the name, Medusa.

 Tamakorogashi / Hecate

 Or "Ball-Roller" is the third most featured monster in the story, and seems to be the most calculating. She is the monster that is noted to be the one that scouted the union agent, Hustle Monkey. She appears in the form of a young woman with green hair held in pig-tails by bowling ball shaped hair clips. She is always accompanied by a ferocious looking black dog that acts like her guardian. This dog is probably a part of her true form. As her hair clips may indicate, she is fond of bowling and prefers to play in a bowling alley of her own creation that is made out of hearses. People who view her balls and pins are assaulted by visions of the people they have wronged. It is shown that she turns her sacrifices into bowling balls (she actually orders her sacrifices based on their weight, so that the ball's weight is more comfortable for her to throw), but it is unknown as to whether or not this also applies to the pins. The monster, Pan, called her, Hecate, when they met up at the Parthenon. This goes along with her dog since black dogs were regularly sacrificed to the Witch-Goddess.

 Pan

 Not much is known about him, the only information is that he is a boy who is wearing glasses and plays a flute. He seems to be interested in Medusa. Pan is a human with goat legs and horns.

 Talos
 Talos can only be seen once for a brief moment. Talos appears to look like a sumotori and he guards the Island of Monsters.

 Monster King Solomon III aka Solo

 The current Monster King, he is a former Melos warrior. After defeating the previous Monster King, the Melody of Oblivion told him that the monsters would attack the humans indiscriminately.  And if every monster were to be defeated, then humans would turn into monsters. The only way to prevent it would be for Solo to take up the role of Monster King himself. He pleads with Bocca to join him as his equal, to help relieve the extreme loneliness of his position. Solomon goes so far as to offer Bocca half of the world to control if he would only join him. He keeps the Melody of Oblivion in chains at his palace on the Island of Monsters.  Solo is also riddled with guilt over what he has done to protect people.  He has the ability to instantly hypnotise humans and control them into doing what every Solo desires. He uses this ability to kill the Prime Minister of Japan.

Monster Union

 Midnight Hiyoko

After having her home town's hot springs discovered as a fake and her sister stealing her boyfriend, she dedicates herself to the monster union.  She causes her town to be under constant night, which makes it famous for 'A town without dawn, or always in dusk'. Her robot monster is a large flying rooster. Her real name is Keiko Hamasaki.

 Millionaire Beaver

A childhood friend of Toune, she was recruited by Medusa while they were looking for Sky Blue, Toune's future Aiba Machine. She was jealous of Toune for being liked by Eichi instead of her, and after Toune's return fears he will run away with her. She is in charge of a dam that holds all of the tears of children saddened by adults. The tears are collected by robot rats, and are counted as a way determining which adults are eligible to be Monster Union members. Her robot monster is a giant rat, which is made out of a number of her robotic rats. She is defeated by Bocca when he learns the Singing Chord attack. Her real name is Miri Kanaya.

 Wrench Monkey

 He's in charged of a factory of making weapons for the Monster Union. He captures Sayoko as his special love. He gets the shivers when Hecate gets a little upset with him. He pilots a robot monkey as he fights the Warriors of Melos. He appear to have died as Engine One gets destroyed. His real name is Masaru Hashimoto.

 Global Wildcat

 Worked under Hol (Horu) on his mirage island shipping children to him, was defeated by Bocca whose Aiba Machine Elan Vital appeared to be immune to the Aibar Machine sealing attack Global Noise Cannon. His robot monster is a tiger.

 Lucky Thoroughbred

 The older brother of Sayoko. His robot monster is a horse.

 Flying Bunny

 Subordinate to Child Dragon, went to scope out Lucky Thoroughbred's tower and helped Sayoko escape. Fights with a carrot, and rides a carrot shaped flying surfboard. Her robot monster is apparently a giant cocktail waitress (larger version of herself).

 Electric Sheep

Little is known about this boy's past, except he states his true self is dead in real life, and that he is in a dream in real life, after being rudely awoken by Koko he becomes angered and attacks her and the other Melos Warriors.  His robot monster is a giant sheep's head, with thousands of 'electronic sheep', little white electrized balls, that join together to create a ring like shield around him.

 Discount Uribou

Has some past with Toune, possible met her when she had run away from her home village.  Her robot monster is based on pigs.

 Child Dragon

 Leader of the Monster Union, he enjoys sock puppets. His robot monster is a pair of dragons.

Aibar Machines
 Elan Vital (Pegasus Series)

 Bocca's machine. His human form can only be seen in Episode 14 and 24.

 Sky Blue (Unicorn Series)

 Tone's Aibar Machine. In human form, he's a soft-spoken young boy with blue, wavy hair.

 Kuron

 First of the three machines frequently seen with Koko. In human form, he wears glasses.

 Hikari

 Second of the three machines frequently seen with Koko. In human form, he has blonde hair.

 Nick

 Third of the three machines frequently seen with Koko. In Human form, he is the one with the hood on always.

 Jaguar Sun
 Kurofune's machine. Jaguar Sun does not have a human form.  It is last seen on Hol's mirage island, where it waits for Kurofune's return from the Labyrinth.

Mono 4

Rouge Aibar Machine.  Waken up when Engine 2 docks with Mitronome.  In Human form, he has red hair.

Episodes
 Episode 1 - Meros Warrior
 Bocca Serenade, is unhappy with his high school life. He wants to become a warrior like the ones from the story told to him by Tsunagi. After failing a test, he is mocked for his skills with a bow and arrow by his teacher, who believes the arrows should be straight and true from the soul. His love interest, Elle, promises him a date if he passes the retest. Later, Bocca sees his parents bribing the teacher to ensure he will pass. He then returns to Tsunagi's shop, where he meets the warrior Kurofune Ballad, who fights against the monsters. Kurofune then begins to fight the monster Hor, who has just eaten a child.

 Episode 2 - The Beginning of a Long School Break
 Bocca has become a Meros Warrior, and Tsunagi gives the young warrior his own Aibar machine.
 Left with more questions than answers when Tsunagi abandons him, Bocca once again encounters the pickpocket, Sayako. And the pair soon finds trouble in school. Hor appears again to eat Elle, the daughter of the local Monster Union Agent. After Kurofune and Bocca fight him off and destroy his bus, Hor retreats. Kurofune heads away with a warning not to follow him to Sayako. Bocca and Sayako then say goodbye to Elle and drive off on Bocca's Aibar.

 Episode 3 - White Night Cape
 After going on their journey, Bokka and Sayako arrive in a town called "Bakuyagou", or "White Night Cape", where it's always dark, and morning never rises, making it a perfect place for tourist attractions.
 It also seems like whenever the mysterious lighthouse shines red, no child appears on the streets, for they fear that their children would be killed by something. Bocca came to ask a knowledgeable lady about Melos Warriors.
 Bocca also found himself saving a young girl, Kew, from a robot creature, who was conveniently a little sister of the owner of an inn, who allowed them to stay for the night, as a debt.
 The two travelers knew there was something wrong with the city, since the residents didn't seem like they wanted to be saved or anything, even though there was something as dangerous as the robot creature.
 What lies in store for them? What is wrong with White Night Cape?

 Episode 4 - Monster Union
 Bocca finally learns that the robot creature he fought before was from the organization, Monster Union, who are humans who serve under the monsters, using the robot creatures as their weapons.
 Keiko Hamasaki, the sister of Kew, and the owner of the inn, remembers her past, and is reminded of why she joined the Monster Union.
 Later, the robot creature strikes again, and Bocca is faced with it again, giving Bocca a great surprise.

 Episode 5 - The Voice Reaching Out to You
 Although knowing the problems of White Night Cape, Bocca continues to try and destroy the Monster Union robot creature.
 Everyone in the town knows of his intentions, and sends Bocca into jail.
 Sayako finds out that Kew knows about Keiko siding with the Monster Union, and saves Bocca from jail.
 Even with Sayako's warning, Bocca still calls for his Aiba-Machine and tries to save Kew from her sister's hands.
 The battle of Bocca vs. Midnight Fledgling begins.

 Episode 6 - Pyramid Scheme Valley
 While following Kurofune, Bocca and Sayako encounter a dead end, but finds 'Nezumikoukoku', or 'Pyramid Scheme Valley', and also find a dam with a mural of a tear on it.
 The duo goes to it, and find a beautiful boy with sky blue hair. They also meet up with the artist of the mural, Eichi Hikoyama, who seems to be hired by a woman named Miri Kanaya who owns the dam.
 Miri also owns mice that gather tears around the world for her dam. Bocca and Sayako pass as art students for Eichi, and stay in the village.
 The two find out from Eichi that the boy from the dam was neither Monster nor human, and people call him a demon, and despise him.
 The next day, Sayako found a girl with a large jewel around her neck, and decided to try and steal it.
 Meanwhile, another robot creature appears in the valley, of which Bocca quickly drives away.
 While he tries to chase it, he encounters a whole bunch of mice, who attack him. With an odd sound, he realized he was saved by the girl Sayako met.
 When she saw he was a Melos Warrior, she quickly drew her bow, and pointed an arrow at him. Exactly what's up with this place?

 Episode 7 - Meigen
 Bocca learns that the girl who had aimed her arrow at him is named Tone. And she appears to hate Melos Warriors. He also learns that the technique that she uses to drive the "working mouse away" is a Melos technique.
 However he notices that she has no stigmatic mark on her arm. On learning of Tone's return to the valley, Miri Kanaya becomes agitated and recalls back her earlier years, of how and why she joined the Monster Union.
 The relationships between her, Tone, Eichi Hikoyama and the blue-eyed boy are also revealed.

 Episode 8 - The Fated Road Afar
 Eichi completes the mural on the dam's wall, he tells Tone that the rest will be left to them before he leaves.
 Miri under the orders of the Monster, rides her 'Rat Monster' for a final battle with Bocca. Bocca uses the "Crying Bow String" technique to defeat Miri.
 The Dam is destroyed to reveal Eichi's final work. When Tone and Bocca part their ways, it is revealed that the blue eyed boy is Tone's Aibar machine.
 Bocca also spots Tone's stigmatic mark on her thigh.

 Episode 9 - Apeman Turn
 Bocca and Sayoko arrives at a huge industrial region. Sayoko befriends a strange girl by the name of Coco. Coco tells Sayoko that she is involved in a theatrical play nearby.
 Bocca and Sayoko later meet up with a guy who offers Bocca a job as a security guard.
 And while Bocca faces a team of saboteurs of the delivery truck that he is protecting, Sayoko is taken prisoner by the guy, who reveals himself to be a member of the Monster Union.
 Bocca's bow is damaged during battle, but his Aibar machine provides him a more stronger bow. As the battle goes on, the saboteurs which includes Coco, realizes who Bocca is and stops the battle.
 They show Bocca the contents in the truck and brings him to see someone he knows.

 Episode 10 - Unicorn Series
 Bocca meets up with his old friend Tsunagi. Tsunagi tells to Bocca about the Space Fort named Mitranome, and about 'Engine One'.
 The team intends to destroy Engine One, but Bocca wants to save Sayoko first.
 The team then splits into two. Bocca, Coco and another team mate goes to save Sayoko.
 The rest sets off to destroy Engine One.

 Episode 11 - A Song You Still Don't Know About
 Bocca and the team successfully saves Sayoko. Sayoko reveals to them that there are still people in Engine One. They decide to try and save them too.
 The Monster Union member is later defeated in battle, but reveals that the people aren't really 'humans' but have been turned into something better.
 Tsunagi, in his attempt to destroy Engine One from the control station, finds a recording of someone he knew and had thought betrayed him. The recording reveals some surprises.
 Bocca wants Tsunagi to leave the place with him before the whole place blows up, but Tsunagi insists on staying.
 The team leaves without Tsunagi, and Engine One blows up.

 Episode 12 - Maze Island
 In Bocca and Sayoko continuing search for Kurofune, they find Kurofune's Aibar machine, "Jaguar of the Sun". The Aibar machine reveals to them that Kurofune is on a very strange island.
 They try to make their way to the island and end up in a cave with strange murals. Bocca then fights a Monster Union agent before proceeding towards the labyrinth.

 Episode 13 - Kurofune
 In this labyrinth, where space and time can be curved or warped, Bocca is able to meet with the child sacrifice, Solo, as well as Kurofune.
 Bocca witnesses the battle between Horu and Kurofune that happened in the past. Horu was defeated but was able to survive by hiding in the labyrinth because of the warped time.
 Bocca parted ways with Kurofune and later got separated from Solo, so he wanders off by himself in the labyrinth. He encounters an adult Elle, who offers him a celebration if he will give her a lifeline. He refuses, stating that if he had chosen her he would never have begun his path as a Melos Warrier.

 Episode 14 - The Entrance Called the Exit
 Bocca meets with Kei in the illusionary bus. They share thoughts about their dreams, and Bocca reveals his feelings for Sayoko.
 He learns that Kei and all the rest of the children that Horu, the monster, has devoured are digested repeatedly. Bocca later finds himself back at the stadium facing Horu in battle.
 Having faced that very same battle before, Bocca easily defeats Horu. Horu escapes to heal himself. Bocca and Kurofune meets once again, Bocca wants Kurofune to leave the maze, he tells him that Sayoko is waiting for him.
 But Kurofune wants Bocca to leave instead and let him finish Horu himself. They both exchange 'arrow fire', and Bocca loses. Kurofune seeks out Horu, and finds him healed.
 Kurofune tells Horu that he has already killed him and that he will never be able to leave the maze. Kurofune fires a bolt of arrow into the walls of the maze, and runs through the walls.
 Bocca who was trapped in the maze finally escapes the maze and is pulled out of the sea waters onto a boat, into the waiting arms of Sayoko.
 They learn that the island had sunk a long time ago.

 Episode 15 - Fortune River
 Bocca and Sayoko arrives at a tourist spot. Sayoko's investigation into the place reveals that several tourists have gone missing there.
 They spot the body of Tone's Aibar machine, Skyblue, the blue eyed boy, lying close to the waters. Bocca revives him with the aid of his Aibar machine.
 They learn that Tone has been taken prisoner at a castle managed by a member of the Monster Union known as Lucky Thoroughbred. Skyblue suddenly warns them that they had been spotted and that the enemy was headed their way.
 Flying Bunny, a girl in a bunny costume riding a flying board, arrives. Bocca, Sayoko and Skyblue are spotted by her. She goes on an aerial attack.
 In the battle against Flying Bunny, Bocca's Aibar machine attempts to fly but is unsuccessful. Bocca successfully wounds Flying Bunny, and she retreats to the castle to heal herself.
 She meets with Lucky Thoroughbred and they exchange some harsh words. Lucky Thoroughbred reveals his intent to set bombs all over the world and then visits his captive, Tone.
 Skyblue meanwhile, meets up with another Airbar machine, the one who uses boomerangs as weapons. They fight each other. Sayoko meanwhile tries to kiss Bocca, but Bocca hesitates.
 Sayoko learns why, she realizes that Melody is watching them. Sayoko runs off feeling hurt. She is suddenly greeted by Lucky Thoroughbred in his monster machine.
 Sayoko however, looks more surprised than afraid. And instead calls him, "brother".

 Episode 16 - Sayoko
 With Sayako and Toune trapped in the castle of Lucky Thoroughbred, Bocca and Koko sneak in to save both. While on the way in, the two get more than a bit comfortable with each other, and Coco tells her story to the boy.
 Within the castle, a helpless Sayako is reminded of her old family, and of her brother's "achievement" to become a Monster Union agent. Meanwhile, the two Melos Warriors go separate ways.
 Bocca eventually meets up with Lucky Thoroughbred, agreeing to a race with his robot monster over a lake of water, since if Bocca wins, his friends would be released.
 At the same time, Koko in off saving Toune, when met up with Flying Bunny, where trouble starts to occur. What happen there? And can Bocca win the race with his flightless Aibar-Machine?

 Episode 17 - Having wings even though one is not an angel
 Tone and Sayako are held hostage in the tower. And Coco and Bocca have gone in to rescue them.
 However, Shuuma has explosives planted all over the castle and he will not hesitate to set them off.

 Episode 18 - Tokyo Station
 Sayako receives a message to return home. But she wants to know where her relationship with Bocca is going first.
 The Armed Theatrical Group arrives to search for 'Engine Two'.

 Episode 19 - The War of the 20th Century
 The kidnapped prime minister is interrogated by the Armed Theatrical Group. The prime minister reveals his intended deal with the Monster Union.
 He also mentions about his lost daughter. The origin of the new Monster King is also revealed.

 Episode 20 - The Sun Is Calling Out to You
 Coco meets her dad finally. The warriors must defeat Electric Sheep.
 And Bocca and Sayako may have to split.

 Episode 21 - Area Out of Range
 The Meros warriors are on the Mahoroba and on a course to Mitranome.
 But the space port is guarded by the monster union and they intend to stop them.

 Episode 22 - Mitranome
 A new unicorn series is discovered in the ship, but he is not on the side of the Meros Warriors.
 The battle in the Mitranome goes on.

 Episode 23 - Like an Arrow that Pierced Through the World
 The Vinderlize intends to destroy the Mitranome.
 Child Dragon utilises a weapon that can immobilise the Aibar Machines.
 And the secret of Project Silent is revealed.

 Episode 24 - And Yet, The Dawn of You Who Begins a Journey
 Bocca returns to Earth and finally meets the Monster King.
 The Monster King reveals the secret about the Melody of Oblivion.

Theme songs
 Opening
 "Will" by Lisa Komine

 Ending
  by Minawo

External links
TBS official site (Japanese)
J.C.Staff website for the series (Japanese)
Gainax site for the series (Japanese)
 

2004 anime television series debuts
Gainax
Geneon USA
J.C.Staff
Odex
Shōnen manga
TBS Television (Japan) original programming